Matvei Volkov (born 13 March 2004) is a Belarusian athlete who specializes in the pole vault. He was the gold medallist at the World Athletics U20 Championships in 2021.

References

External links 

 Matvei Volkov at World Athletics

Living people
2004 births
Belarusian male pole vaulters
World Athletics U20 Championships winners